Crematogaster batesi is a species of ant in tribe Crematogastrini. It was described by Forel in 1911.

References

batesi
Insects described in 1911